Philipp Bönig (born 20 March 1980) is a German former professional footballer who played as a left-back, and a manager.

Career

Youth
Born in Erding (Bavaria), West Germany, Bönig started to play football at the local club Eintracht Freising. His first position was keeper but after a couple of matches he moved to the left offensive midfield. Two of his brothers are also football players: his brother Sebastian played more than hundred matches in the second Bundesliga for LR Ahlen and Union Berlin, and his youngest brother Vincent played in the second team of FC Ingolstadt 04.

After impressing as a junior, Bönig joined Bayern Munich as a 14-year-old in 1994 and played there for seven years. In the last year he established himself in the second team of the club which played in the Regionalliga. While playing at Bayern Munich, Bönig made twenty starts for the German national youth teams.

MSV Duisburg
In 2001, Bönig started his professional career at MSV Duisburg in the 2. Bundesliga and stayed for two seasons at this club. In this period he made 66 matches and scored two goals. Since his contract expired at the summer of 2003 he got offers from different clubs and he decided to move to then Bundesliga club, VfL Bochum.

VfL Bochum
In his first season 2003–04 VfL Bochum qualified itself for the UEFA Cup and Bönig played three matches for Team 2006. However, in the following season Bochum were relegated to the 2. Bundesliga. But in the next season, they returned directly to the highest level again. After Bochum could maintain themselves in the season 2006–07 his contract was extended until the season 2009–10. In the winter of 2009 Tomasz Zdebel left the club which made Bönig the longest-serving player at the club in the selection.

Bönig acts normally as left defender. His biggest assets are his mentality and fighting spirit, which made him to a crowd-pleaser in the past years. He never scored a goal in the German Bundesliga in his over 150 matches.

Coaching career
Bönig started his coaching career with the U19s of JFG Sempt Erding in October 2016. In April 2018 it was confirmed, that he would take charge of BCF Wolfratshausen from the 2018-19 season. He left the position in the summer 2019 to become the manager of VfR Garching. After only 16 games, Bönig resigned by mutual consent on 30 October 2019 after the team had been in the relegation zone for several games.

Career statistics

Honours
Ferencváros
Hungarian Cup: 2014–15
Hungarian League Cup: 2012–13, 2014–15

VfL Bochum
2. Bundesliga: 2005–06

References

External links
 

1980 births
Living people
People from Erding
Sportspeople from Upper Bavaria
German footballers
Footballers from Bavaria
Association football defenders
FC Bayern Munich II players
MSV Duisburg players
VfL Bochum players
VfL Bochum II players
Ferencvárosi TC footballers
Bundesliga players
2. Bundesliga players
Nemzeti Bajnokság I players
Germany B international footballers
German football managers
German expatriate footballers
German expatriate sportspeople in Hungary
Expatriate footballers in Hungary